N.Gopalapillai was a critic and a Sanskrit scholar who wrote in Malayalam and Sanskrit. He was born in Thiruvananthapuram District of Kerala State in India.

See also
G. Kamalamma, biographer of N. Gopala Pillai

References

Indian Sanskrit scholars
Date of birth missing
Date of death missing